Ekis: Walang Tatakas is a 1999 Philippine crime drama film co-written and directed by Erik Matti. The film stars Sunshine Cruz and Albert Martinez.

Cast
 Albert Martinez as Gene
 Sunshine Cruz as Dolor
 Raymond Bagatsing as Roger
 Ace Espinosa as Alvaro
 Jaime Fabregas as Eliseo
 Ryan Eigenmann as Emman
 John Arceo as Pitong
 J.J. Chua as Winston
 John Arcilla as George
 Soliman Cruz as Manny
 Romeo Vasquez as Major Duterte
 William Martinez as Nilo
 Bert Martinez as Director Felizario
 Maureen Larrazabal as Weng
 Susan Enriquez as News Reporter
 Mel Kimura as Truding
 Rey Solo as SPO1 Han Solo
 Steve Salvador as Self
 Nonoy Torrente as Blindman
 Matt Fajardo as Man with Dog

References

External links

1999 films
Filipino-language films
Philippine drama films
Viva Films films
Films directed by Erik Matti